ASMC Sukhumi is a Georgian football club. It was formed by IDP from Abkhazia, as Dinamo Sukhumi. It's named after the most successful club from Abkhaz ASSR, FC Dinamo Sukhumi.

From 2000–01 to 2004–05 season, the club played in the Regionuli Liga, but after the season, was invited to play in Umaglesi Liga 2005–06.

In 2006, the club changed its name to ASMC Sukhumi and played in Regionuli Liga 2006–07.

Seasons
{|class="wikitable"
|-bgcolor="#efefef"
! Season
! League
! Pos.
! Pl.
! W
! D
! L
! GF
! GA
! P
! Cup
! Notes
! Manager
|-
|2000–01
|bgcolor=#98bb98|Regionuli Liga West
|align=right|
|align=right| ||align=right| ||align=right| ||align=right|
|align=right| ||align=right| ||align=right|
|
|
|-
|2001–02
|bgcolor=#98bb98|Regionuli Liga West
|align=right|
|align=right| ||align=right| ||align=right| ||align=right|
|align=right| ||align=right| ||align=right|
|
|
|-
|2002–03
|bgcolor=#98bb98|Regionuli Liga West
|align=right|
|align=right| ||align=right| ||align=right| ||align=right|
|align=right| ||align=right| ||align=right|
|
|
|-
|2003–04
|bgcolor=#98bb98|Regionuli Liga East
|align=right|
|align=right| ||align=right| ||align=right| ||align=right|
|align=right| ||align=right| ||align=right|
|
|
|-
|2004–05
|bgcolor=#98bb98|Regionuli Liga East
|align=right|
|align=right| ||align=right| ||align=right| ||align=right|
|align=right| ||align=right| ||align=right|
|
|
|-
|2005–06
|Umaglesi Liga
|align=right|15
|align=right|30||align=right|5||align=right|3||align=right|22
|align=right|26||align=right|70||align=right|18
|Round of 16
|
|-
|2006–07
|bgcolor=#98bb98|Regionuli Liga East
|align=right|
|align=right| ||align=right| ||align=right| ||align=right|
|align=right| ||align=right| ||align=right|
|
|
|-
|}

References

ASMC Sukhumi
Sport in Sukhumi
Football in Abkhazia